Fresh Aire is the first album by new-age musical group Mannheim Steamroller. It was originally released in 1975.

Background
The record was followed by seven additional albums in the Fresh Aire series. Each of the first four Fresh Aire albums is based on a season; Fresh Aire's theme is Spring. (There is some evidence that this theme may have been imposed upon the album after the fact, as the rest of the series progressed, since the liner notes for this album clearly link each of the 12 tracks to the 12 months of the year.)

Besides the eponymous seventh tune, several of the track names are played on musical terms denoting the form of that song. The title track "Fresh Aire" is an air, "Saras Band" is a sarabande, and "Pass the Keg (Lia)" is a passacaglia.
Composer Chip Davis refers to his music as "18th century rock and roll."

Track listing
All songs written and arranged by Chip Davis.
"Prelude" – 1:33
"Chocolate Fudge" – 2:54
"Interlude I" – 2:55
"Sonata" – 2:32
"Interlude II" – 2:33
"Saras Band" – 3:37
"Fresh Aire" – 5:30
"Rondo" – 2:36
"Interlude III" – 2:36
"Pass the Keg (Lia)" – 2:33
"Interlude IV" – 2:11
"Mist" – 1:47

Personnel
Chip Davis – drums, percussion, recorder
Eric Hansen – bass
Jackson Berkey – keyboards
Don Sears – synthesizer programming, string arrangements
Bill Buntain – trombone on "Pass the Keg"
Denny Schneider – trumpet on "Pass the Keg"
Mortimer Alpert, Dorothy Brown, Hugh Brown, Miriam Duffelmeyer, Ginny Eldred, Lucinda Gladics, James Hammond, Jean Hassel, Joe Landes, Karl Lyon, Bob Malec, Beth McCollum, Virginia Moriarty, Dorothy Redina, Joe Rosenstein, Merton Shatzkin, Alex Sokol, Jess Stern, Larry Sutton, Paul Todd – strings on "Sonata", "Fresh Aire", and "Mist"

Production
Produced By Chip Davis & Don Sears
Recorded & Engineered By Jeff Schiller, Don Sears & Ron Ubel

References

External links
"Fresh Aire" at discogs

1975 debut albums
1
American Gramaphone albums